Whitehall Meadows is a   Local Nature Reserve in Canterbury in Kent. It is owned and managed by Canterbury City Council.

This wet meadow has typical damp loving wildlife including snails, butterflies, damselflies, dragonflies and reptiles.

This site is divided into two halves, with the River Great Stour running between them. A cycle path runs through the northern part.

References

Local Nature Reserves in Kent